2020 Tipsport liga is the twenty-third edition of the annual football tournament in Czech Republic.

Groups

Group A
 All matches will be played in Xaverov.

Group B
 All matches will be played in Mladá Boleslav.

Group C
 All matches will be played in Dunajská Streda, Slovakia.

Group D
 All matches will be played in Ostrava.

Semifinals

Third place

Final

Goalscorers
3 goals

  Petr Hronek
  Jiří Klíma
  Jakub Přichystal
  Tomáš Wágner
  Milan Ristovski
  Patrik Abrahám

2 goals

  David Buchta
  Jan Chramosta
  Adam Fousek
  Jan Hladík
  Lukáš Holík
  Adam Jánoš
  Jan Koudelka
  Ondřej Pachlopník
  David Pech
  Patrizio Stronati
  Lukáš Hlavatovič

1 goal

  Izzy Tandir
  Eduardo Santos
  Marko Divković
  Nikola Gatarić
  Jakub Barac
  Timofej Barkov
  David Breda
  Ondřej Chvěja
  Samuel Dancák
  Jan Díl
  Daniel Fišl
  Filip Hašek
  Michael Hönig
  Josef Jakab
  Daniel Kozma
  Ondřej Lingr
  Vojtěch Patrák
  Michal Petráň
  Tomáš Pilík
  Daniel Pudil
  David Puškáč
  Lukáš Raab
  Matěj Šimon
  Jakub Šípek
  Radek Smékal
  Michal Šmíd
  Tomáš Smola
  Karel Soldát
  Jan Šteigl
  Šimon Šumbera
  Jakub Teplý
  Daniel Tetour
  Ondřej Ullman
  Lukáš Vácha
  Marek Vintr
  Adriel Ba Loua
  Zoran Petrović
  Erick Davis
  Aleksei Tatayev
  Mihajilo Popović
  Damián Bariš
  Pavol Farkaš
  Marek Frimmel
  Kuliš
  Dominik Martišiak
  Matúš Mikuš
  Michal Ranko
  Samuel Šefčík
  Erdi Şehit
  Eric Ramírez

1 own goal

  Jan Kvída
  Jiří Piroch

References

Tipsport
Tipsport